Fall Lake is a lake in the U.S. state of Minnesota.

Fall Lake was named for a waterfall on the short stream connecting Fall Lake with Garden Lake.

See also
List of lakes in Minnesota

References

Lakes of Minnesota
Lakes of Lake County, Minnesota
Lakes of St. Louis County, Minnesota